The Israeli Basketball Premier League MVP, or Israeli Basketball Super League MVP, is an annual basketball award that is presented to the most valuable player in a given season of the Israeli Basketball Premier League, which is the top-tier level professional basketball league in Israel.

Winners

See also
Israeli Basketball Premier League Finals MVP

References

External links
Israeli Premier League Official website 
Israeli Premier League Official website 

 
Basketball most valuable player awards
European basketball awards